Baron Amwell, of Islington in the County of London, is a title in the Peerage of the United Kingdom. It was created on 16 July 1947 for the Labour politician Frederick Montague. He had previously represented Islington West in the House of Commons and served as Under-Secretary of State for Air from 1929 to 1931.  the title is held by his grandson, the third Baron, who succeeded his father in 1990.

Barons Amwell (1947)
Frederick Montague, 1st Baron Amwell (1876–1966)
Frederick Norman Montague, 2nd Baron Amwell (1912–1990)
Keith Norman Montague, 3rd Baron Amwell (b. 1943)

The heir apparent is the present holder's son the Hon. Ian Keith Montague (b. 1973)
The heir apparent's heir, and next in line, is his son Oliver Montague (b. 2007)

References

Kidd, Charles, Williamson, David (editors). Debrett's Peerage and Baronetage (1990 edition). New York: St Martin's Press, 1990, 

Baronies in the Peerage of the United Kingdom
Noble titles created in 1947
Noble titles created for UK MPs